Santtu Oskari Mörö (born 31 January 1993 in Lohja) is a Finnish hurdler.

Mörö recorded his new personal best time of 49.08 in his semifinal heat in 2014 European Championships, and also made a new national record. Mörö was the last competitor to qualify for the final.

Competition record

References

1993 births
Living people
People from Lohja
Finnish male hurdlers
Athletes (track and field) at the 2010 Summer Youth Olympics
Athletes (track and field) at the 2016 Summer Olympics
Olympic athletes of Finland
Finnish Athletics Championships winners
Competitors at the 2017 Summer Universiade
Sportspeople from Uusimaa